Vrhpolje pri Kamniku is a settlement in the Municipality of Kamnik in the Upper Carniola region of Slovenia. Urban expansion has turned it into a single continuous settlement with the neighbouring settlement of Nevlje. The main road from Kamnik into the Tuhinj Valley runs through Vrhpolje.

Name
The name of the settlement was changed from Vrhpolje to Vrhpolje pri Kamniku in 1955. In the past the German name was Oberfeld.

Gallery

References

External links

Vrhpolje pri Kamniku on Geopedia

Populated places in the Municipality of Kamnik